Kingdom is an American drama television series created by Byron Balasco. The series premiered on October 8, 2014, on the Audience Network and concluded on August 2, 2017. It stars Frank Grillo, Kiele Sanchez, Matt Lauria, Jonathan Tucker, Nick Jonas and Joanna Going. Season one consists of ten episodes. DirecTV renewed the series for a 20-episode second season, 10 of which aired in 2015 and 10 in 2016. On July 7, 2016, it was renewed for a third and final season.

Series overview

Episodes

Season 1 (2014)

Season 2 (2015–16)

Season 3 (2017)

References

External links

Kingdom